Molly Jovic (born 7 October 1995) is an Australian netball player in the Suncorp Super Netball league, playing for the Collingwood Magpies.

Career
Jovic was signed by the Collingwood Magpies as one of ten senior-contracted players ahead of the 2020 season, signed as a replacement for the long-term injured Ashleigh Brazill. Jovic's netball career grew out of appearances for the Victorian Fury (2017–18) and Tasmanian Magpies (2019) in the second-tier Australian Netball League. She was also named in 2019 Victorian Netball League Championship Team of the Year.

References

External links
 Collingwood Magpies profile

Australian netball players
Collingwood Magpies Netball players
Living people
Victorian Netball League players
Australian Netball League players
Victorian Fury players
Tasmanian Magpies players
Netball players from Victoria (Australia)
People educated at Wesley College (Victoria)
1995 births